William Aar (born 23 October 1997) is a Norwegian handball player for Ribe-Esbjerg HH and the Norwegian national team.

He represented Norway at the 2020 European Men's Handball Championship.

References

External links

1997 births
Living people
Norwegian male handball players
Sportspeople from Trondheim
Expatriate handball players
Norwegian expatriate sportspeople in Denmark